Igor Jakubowski (born 6 August 1992) is a Polish boxer. He competed in the men's heavyweight event at the 2016 Summer Olympics.

References

External links
 
 
 
 

1992 births
Living people
Polish male boxers
Olympic boxers of Poland
Boxers at the 2016 Summer Olympics
People from Żory
Sportspeople from Silesian Voivodeship
Heavyweight boxers
20th-century Polish people
21st-century Polish people